Gerry Perry Jr.  (born June 1, 1947) is an American former tennis player who was a runner-up at the 1968 US Open mixed doubles with Tory Fretz.

Career
In 1968, he partnered Tory Fretz in the mixed doubles at the  US Open, and they reached the final, losing in straight sets to Mary-Ann Eisel and Peter Curtis. 

In 1989, Perry was inducted into the USTA Missouri Valley Hall of Fame.

Grand Slam finals

Mixed doubles (1 runner-up)

References

External links
 
 

1947 births
Living people
American male tennis players
Sportspeople from Springfield, Missouri
Tennis people from Missouri